Michael Williams (born July 16, 1961) is a former American football running back who played three seasons in the National Football League (NFL) with the Philadelphia Eagles and Atlanta Falcons. He was drafted by the Eagles in the fourth round of the 1983 NFL Draft. He first enrolled at Northeast Mississippi Community College before transferring to Mississippi College. Williams attended Escambia County High School in Atmore, Alabama.

References

External links
Just Sports Stats

Living people
1961 births
Players of American football from Alabama
American football running backs
African-American players of American football
Northeast Mississippi Tigers football players
Mississippi College Choctaws football players
Philadelphia Eagles players
Atlanta Falcons players
People from Atmore, Alabama
21st-century African-American people
20th-century African-American sportspeople